The Siamese invasion of Kedah was a military operation mounted by the Kingdom of Siam against the Sultanate of Kedah in November 1821, in the area of what is now northern Peninsula Malaysia.

Background
The Sultanate of Kedah had been a tributary state to Siam during the Ayutthaya period, though the extent of Siamese influence over Northern Malay Sultanates varied over time. After the Fall of Ayutthaya in 1767, the Northern Malay Sultanates were freed from Siamese domination temporarily. In 1786, Francis Light managed to obtain a lease of Penang Island from Sultan Abdullah Mukarram Shah of Kedah on behalf of British East India Company in exchange for British military supports against the Siamese or Burmese. However, in the same year, Siam re-exerted control over Northern Malay Sultanates and sacked Pattani. Francis Light, however, failed to secure the British military assistance against Siam and Kedah came under Siamese suzerainty. The bunga mas was sent triennially to the Bangkok court.

During the Burmese Invasion of Phuket in 1809, Sultan Ahmad Tajuddin Halim Shah II, who was known in Thai sources as "Tuanku Pangeran", contributed a sizable force from Kedah to aid the Siamese against the Burmese. In 1813, King Rama II commanded Sultan Ahmad Tajuddin Halim Shah of Kedah to bring the Sultanate of Perak under Siamese control. Sultan Ahmad Tajuddin Halim Shah then sent forces to capture and occupy Perak under the domination of Kedah on behalf of Siam in 1818. This earned Sultan Ahmad Tajuddin Halim Shah a great favor of the Siamese king, who raised the sultan to the rank of Chao Phraya - which was superior to Nakhon Noi the governor of Ligor or Nakhon Si Thammarat who held the rank of Phraya. In 1811, Sultan Ahmad Tajuddin Halim Shah came into conflicts with his brother Tunku Bisnu. Tunku Bisnu approached Phraya Nakhon Noi of Ligor and sought Siamese support. Tunku Bisnu was then made the ruler of Setul.

In 1820, King Bagyidaw of Burma planned another invasion of Siam, in which the Kedah Sultanate would inevitably become involved. Tunku Mom, a younger brother of the sultan, informed Phraya Nakhon Noi that the sultan of Kedah was forming an alliance with the Burmese against Siam. Lim Hoi, a Phuket-based Chinese merchant caught a Burmese ship bearing a Burmese letter to the Sultan Ahmad Tajuddin Halim Shah. Phraya Nakhon Noi then relayed the information to the Bangkok court. King Rama II ordered the sultan of Kedah to go to Bangkok to explain. Sultan Ahmad Tajuddin Halim Shah of Kedah did not go and ceded bunga mas altogether. King Rama II then ordered Phraya Nakhon Noi of Ligor to invade Kedah Sultanate in 1821.

Campaigns
The Siamese had still been unsure about the intentions of the sultan and Kedah had not aware of Siamese invasion. Phraya Nakhon Noi had already organized a fleet of 7,000 men at Trang and Satun in his preparations against the speculated Burmese invasions. Pretending to launch attack on Mergui and Tenasserim Coast, Phraya Nakhon Noi requested Sultan Ahmad Tajuddin for provisions. When the Kedahan did not arrive to provide supplies, Nakhon Noi headed his fleet towards Alor Setar in November 1821.

When Nakhon Noi arrived at Alor Setar, the Kedahan were still unaware of Siamese intention to invade. Paduka Maharaja Sura the Bendahara ceremoniously received the Siamese entourage. Once in the fort, Nakhon Noi ordered his men to attack. Paduka Maharaja Sura the Bendahara was captured and Paduka Seri Raja the Laksamana was killed in battle. However, Sultan Ahmad Tajuddin Halim Shah managed to flee from the city and took refuge on Penang Island, then under British control. Villages were torched and homes were looted. A great number of Malays also fled to Penang and Province Wellesley.

Aftermath
After taking the city, Phraya Nakhon Noi established the Siamese administration over the Kedah State and made his son Phra Pakdiborrirak as the Siamese governor of Kedah. Siam imposed the direct rule through Ligor and installed Siamese personnel in Kedah, thus the sultanate ceased to exist for a time. For his victory over Kedah, King Rama II raised Nakhon Noi to the rank of Chao Phraya and granted his son Phra Pakdiborrirak the title of Phraya Abhaydhibetr. Phraya Abhaydhibetr would govern Kedah on behalf of his father the governor of Ligor for seventeen years from 1821 until 1838.

By 1822 there was a rise in the population of the British territories caused by an influx of Malays displaced by the invasion. The Siamese presence in Kedah threatened British holdings in Penang, who speculated the Siamese invasion of the island. This prompted Marquess of Hastings, the Governor-General of India, to send John Crawfurd to Bangkok, leading to the first contact between Siam and the British Empire in the Rattanakosin period. Crawfurd arrived in Bangkok in April 1822, he presented the personal letter of Sultan Ahmad Tajuddin Halim Shah to King Rama II blaming Nakhon Noi "the Raja of Ligor" for the incidents. The agreements were not reached as Siam asserted her authorities over Kedah and the sultan. Three years later in 1825, Chao Phraya Nakhon Noi prepared a fleet to invade and conquer the sultanates of Perak and Selangor. Robert Fullerton warned the Raja of Ligor that the Siamese invasion of the sultanates would violate the Anglo-Dutch Treaty of 1824 but the warnings went unheeded. Fullerton then sent gunboats to impose blockade on the Trang River in modern Trang Province where the brigantine fleet of Nakhon Noi was being dispatched and the Siamese expedition was called off.

The Burney Treaty was concluded between Siam and British Empire on 26 June 1826. The Burney Treaty allowed the Siamese view of their rights to prevail. The British government accepted Siamese influence over Kedah in exchange for free trade on stocks and provisions between Siam and Prince of Wales Island and Siam's relinquished claims on Selangor. The British also agreed to move Sultan Ahmad Tajuddin to somewhere else. The Article XIII of the treaty stated that: "The English engage that they will make arrangements for the former Governor of Queda to go and live in some other Country, and not at Prince of Wales' Island or Prye, or in Perak, Salengore, or any Burmese Country." The former sultan of Kedah was then forcibly moved to Malacca. However, Penang continued to be the center of resistance to Siamese rule. Tengku Kudin, a nephew of Sultan Ahmad Tajuddin, captured Alor Setar from the Siamese in 1831, though Chao Phraya Nakhon Noi retook Alor Setar four months later. Another resistance of Kedah came in 1838 when two nephews of Sultan Admah Tajuddin joined with Wan Mali to take Alor Setar. Only after the death of Chao Phraya Nakhon Noi in 1838 that the native Malay rule was restored. Tunku Anom was made the governor of Kedah in 1838 until when Sultan Ahmad Tajuddin pledged for himself to be restored. The Sultan Ahmad Tajuddin, after twenty years of exile, was eventually restored to the Kedah Sultanate in 1842 under Siamese suzerainty.

Notes

Conflicts in 1821
1821 in Asia
1820s in Siam
History of Kedah
19th century in Siam
19th century in Malaysia